The Order of the Crown of King Zvonimir was an order awarded by the Independent State of Croatia (NDH). It was established as a "visible sign of decoration for merits done, in peace or in war, for Croatian people and Independent State of Croatia" It was established by Croatian leader Ante Pavelić on May 15, 1941. The bearers of the grand order and bearers of the first class order were given the title of knight (vitez). 

The back of the award contained the years 1076 - King Zvonimir's crowning, and 1941 - the establishment of the NDH. The front said Bog i Hrvati.

Grand Cross with Star

Vladimir Laxa
Ivan Perčević
Adolf Sabljak

1st Class Cross with Star 
 Vilko Begić
 Fedor Dragojlov
 Gjuro Grujić
 Artur Gustović
 Đuro Jakčin
 Franjo Lukac
 Josip Metzger
 Hans Oster
 Tomislav Sertić
 Slavko Štancer
 Helmuth von Pannwitz
 Kornél Oszlányi

1st Class Cross with Swords 
 Johannes-Rudolf Mühlenkamp
 Miroslav Navratil
 Odilo Globocnik

1st Class Cross
 Hans Baur, 1943
 Hans Henrici
 Ferdinand Jodl
 Otto Kumm
 Helwig Luz

2nd Class Cross
 Karl Wolfgang Redlich

3rd Class Cross
 Eduard Bunić
 Ernst Hildebrandt

Sources
 Zakonska odredba o osnutku Reda i Kolajne krune kralja Zvonimira 

Orders, decorations, and medals of the Independent State of Croatia
1941 establishments in Croatia
Awards established in 1941